Heart of England may refer to:
English Midlands
Heart of England School
Heart of England Co-operative Society
Heart of England NHS Foundation Trust
Heart of England Way
Heart of England, a region in the Britain in Bloom horticultural competition